Events from 2021 in Christmas Island.

Incumbents 

 Administrative head: Natasha Griggs

Events 
Ongoing – COVID-19 pandemic in Oceania

 22 March – A bacteria responsible for killing large numbers of the critically endangered Christmas Island chained gecko (Lepidodactylus listeri) is identified.
 1 December– The annual Red crab migration closes roadways across Christmas Island.

References 

Years of the 21st century in Christmas Island
Christmas Island